All in Time may refer to:
All in Time (Jim Cuddy album)
All in Time (Mister Kite album)
All in Time (film)